Kosovo first appeared at the quadrennial Mediterranean Games event in 2018. Kosovo had declared independence from Serbia in 2008. The Olympic committee of Kosovo has been recognized by the International Olympic Committee six years later in December 2014.

Since their first appearance at the 2018 Mediterranean Games in Tarragona, Kosovo athletes won ten medals, in which of them, nine in judo and one bronze medal in Boxing.

As of 2022, Kosovan athletes have won a total of 10 medals. The country's ranking in the history of the Games is the 21st place respectively.

Overview

By event

By sport

Athletes with most medals

The Kosovan athletes who won the most medals in the history of the Mediterranean Games is Judoka Distria Krasniqi, who won two Gold medals for Kosovo. The other Judokas in this list are Loriana Kuka and Akil Gjakova.

Notes: athletes in bold are still active.

List of medalists

2018 Mediterranean Games

2022 Mediterranean Games 

|  style="text-align:left; width:78%; vertical-align:top;"|

See also
Kosovo at the Olympics
Kosovo at the European Games
Kosovo at the Jeux de la Francophonie
Sport in Kosovo

References

External links
Medals table per country and per Games at the official International Committee of Mediterranean Games (CIJM) website

 
Kosovo at multi-sport events